Squared circle may refer to:

 Boxing ring
 Wrestling ring
 Squared-circle postmark
 Square Circle Production, a magic trick
 Squared circle, an alchemical symbol

See also
 Round square (disambiguation)
 Square the Circle (disambiguation)
 Squaring the circle, a geometric problem
 Squaring the circle (disambiguation)
 Circle in the Square Theatre